Jonathan Barnett may refer to:

Jonathan Barnet (1715–1720), privateer active near Jamaica, known for capturing pirate Calico Jack
Jonathan Barnett (sports agent) (born 1950), British football agent
Jonathan Barnett (politician) (born 1955), member of the Arkansas House of Representatives
Jonathan Quinn Barnett (born 1964), American super yacht designer